The Baltic Naval Squadron (BALTRON) was inaugurated in 1998. The main responsibility of BALTRON is to improve the co-operation between the Baltic states in the areas of naval defence and security. Constant readiness to contribute units to NATO-led operations is assured through BALTRON.

Each Baltic state appoints one or two ships to BALTRON for a certain period and staff members for one year. Service in BALTRON provides both (the crew and staff officers) with an opportunity to serve in an international environment and acquire valuable experience in mine countermeasures. Estonia provides BALTRON with on-shore facilities for the staff.

Membership 
There are currently 3 countries in the BALTRON:

Notes

External links
The Baltic Naval Squadron - BALTRON

Military units and formations of NATO
Military projects of the Baltic states
Military of Lithuania
Military of Latvia
Military units and formations of Estonia
Post-Soviet alliances